Peter Zummo (born 1948) is an American composer and trombonist. He has been described as "an important exponent of the American contemporary classical tradition." Meanwhile, he has been quoted as describing his own work as "minimalism and a whole lot more."

Since 1967, Zummo's compositions exploring the rock, jazz, new- and electronic-music, disco, punk, and world-music idioms have been presented in venues including the Brooklyn Academy of Music, New York City Center, Experimental Intermedia Foundation, Dance Theater Workshop, and La MaMa Experimental Theatre Club, among many others in New York City, as well as in numerous additional spaces worldwide. The website of the music magazine Pitchfork called Zummo's music “the sound of sublimity…that sends shivers down the nervous system,” and in an interview with The Quietus, Scottish deejay JD Twitch (Keith McIvor) characterized Zummo's work as “sheer bliss.”

Composing and performing career

Writing in the British culture blog "The Ransom Note," Tim Wilson commented that some of Zummo's "most familiar" music was created with cellist Arthur Russell. Zummo played on most of Russell's recordings and produced several of them. Their collaborations in multiple musical styles included Russell's disco single, “Kiss Me Again.” In it, according to a review in The New Yorker, “phrases emerge and wrap around each other: Peter Zummo’s gorgeous trombone motif, Russell’s pizzicato cello theme, and a growing drone of loud, dissonant guitars…When the smoke clears, genre is just a memory.” In 2014, Zummo and longtime collaborators, bass player Ernie Brooks and percussionist Bill Ruyle, recorded Russell's This Love Is Crying with New Zealand musician and composer Liam Finn.

Russell, in turn, played often for Zummo, notably on the Bessie Award–winning composition Lateral Pass, created for a dance by choreographer Trisha Brown, with a stage set by artist Nancy Graves. In 2014, Foom Music, in London, released an original recording of this 1985 piece. According to Piccadilly Records, the CD demonstrated that “Zummo’s signature trombone style, renowned for its rich and soothing tone, has become one of the most beloved features of Russell’s celebrated sound."

In the fall of 2014, Mikhail Barishnikov's Baryshnikov Arts Center, in New York City, awarded a residency for the creation of new work to Zummo and Brooks. Additional support over the years has come from the National Endowment for the Arts, the New York State Council on the Arts, Meet the Composer, the New York Foundation for the Arts, and other funders.

Zummo appears as himself in Jonathan Demme's Accumulation with Talking Plus Water Motor, a film featuring Trisha Brown, and in  Wild Combination: A Portrait of Arthur Russell, a documentary by Matt Wolf. Zummo contributed to the score of Tramas, Italian director Augusto Contento's cinematic portrait of São Paulo, Brazil, worked with artist Donald Judd to realize Trisha Brown's Newark, and played for Andrei Șerban–Liz Swados collaborations, including Fragments of a Greek Trilogy.

Performing for other bandleaders, Zummo has appeared in the Lounge Lizards, Gods and Monsters, Stephen Gaboury’s B-Twist Orchestra for the dance company Ballets with a Twist, Go: Organic Orchestra, Tilt Brass, Downtown Ensemble, Flexible Orchestra, The Necessaries, and Dinosaur L. He has also played in units put together by composers David Behrman, Philip Corner, Guy De Bievre, Tom Hamilton, William Hellerman, Annea Lockwood, Jackson MacLow, Ben Neill, Phill Niblock, Pauline Oliveros, Vernon Reid, Steve Swell, Yasunao Tone, Lise Vachon, Yoshi Wada, and others. Zummo performed on Teo Macero’s Fusion, which featured both the Lounge Lizards and the London Philharmonic Orchestra.

Education and training

After Zummo's early classical-music education in his hometown, Cleveland, Ohio, he earned bachelor’s and master’s degrees in music and composition at Wesleyan University, in Middletown, Connecticut. There he studied with John Cage, Alvin Lucier, Ken McIntyre, Clifford Thornton, Daoud Haroon, Dick Griffin, and Sam Rivers, among others. After leaving Wesleyan, Zummo moved to New York City, where he continued trombone studies with Carmine Caruso and Roswell Rudd and sought out the influences of James Fulkerson and Stuart Dempster.

In New York City, Zummo developed extended techniques for the trombone and other instruments and created many works, including several with his wife, then-choreographer and dancer Stephanie Woodard. For several years, he wrote music and performance reviews in the SoHo Weekly News. For a 2006 article by “Blue” Gene Tyranny in Dram, Zummo described his compositional approach as being about “persons not instruments,” elaborating that he provides “material for musicians and sufficient instructions, so they don’t make arbitrary but rather logical or heartfelt decisions.” His work, Zummo continued, thus “engenders a social situation reflecting modern society.”

Academic and other positions

Zummo was senior faculty advisor with the New York Arts Program, a New York City-based project of Ohio Wesleyan University and the Great Lakes Colleges Association, and artistic director of The Loris Bend Foundation, a nonprofit presenter of music, dance, and media.

Discography

Selected works:

Composer
Lateral Pass (CD from Foom Music), 2014
Zummo with an X (LP from Optimo Music), 2012
Zummo with an X (CD), 2006
Fast Dream on The Downtown Ensemble's Downtown Only, 2002
Slybersonic Tromosome, with Tom Hamilton, 2000
Experimenting with Household Chemicals (CD), 1995
Zummo with an X (LP), 1985
Travelers Through Days and Days on Sunship's Into the Sun, 1974
(the) Who Stole the Polka? on Guy Klucevsek's Ain’t Nothin’ But A Polka Band,  1991; and on Polka From The Fringe, 2012

Producer 
Arthur Russell's Arthur’s Landing, 2010
Arthur Russell's World Of Echo (CD + DVD), 2005
Arthur Russell's World Of Echo (LP), 2005
Yvette Perez's H*E*R, 2002
Arthur Russell's Disco Not Disco (CD), 2000
Arthur Russell's Tree House/School Bell,  1986

Performer
Red Hot Organization's Master Mix: Red Hot + Arthur Russell, 2014
Adam Rudolph's Go: Organic Orchestra, Sonic Mandala, 2013
Adam Rudolph's Go: Organic Orchestra, Can You Imagine…The Sound of a Dream, 2011
Steve Swell/The Nation of We's The Business of Here, 2012
Heroes of Toolik's Winter Moon, 2012
Kid Creole and the Coconuts’ I Wake Up Screaming, 2010
Arthur Russell's First Thought Best Thought, 2006
Lise Vachon's Vocalise, 2006
David Behrman's My Dear Siegfried, 2005
Guy De Bievre's Bending the Tonic (twice), 2005
Arthur Russell's Calling Out Of Context, 2004 
Yvette Perez's I Fly, 2004 
The Feetwarmers’ Centrifugal Swing, 2000
Tom Hamilton's Off-Hour Wait State, 1996
Arthur Russell's Another Thought, 1994
Annea Lockwood's Thousand Year Dreaming, 1993
Nicolas Collins's 100 of the World’s Most Beautiful Melodies, 1989
Peter Gordon's Brooklyn, 1987
Peter Gordon's Innocent, 1986
Arthur Russell's Instrumentals, 1984 
The Lounge Lizards's Live From the Drunken Boat, 1983
Arthur Russell/Dinosaur L's 24–24 Music, 1981
The Necessaries’ Big Sky, 1981  
Love of Life Orchestra's Star Jaws, 1977

References

1948 births
Living people
Wesleyan University alumni
American male composers
21st-century American composers
American trombonists
Male trombonists
Contemporary classical music performers
Place of birth missing (living people)
Musicians from Cleveland
21st-century trombonists
21st-century American male musicians
The Lounge Lizards members
Didgeridoo players